Reginald Fogwell (23 November 1893, Dartmouth, Devon -1977) was a British film director, producer and screenwriter.

Selected filmography
Director
 The Warning (1928)
 Cross Roads (1930)
 The Written Law (1930)
 Madame Guillotine (1931)
 Guilt (1931)
 Betrayal (1932)
 The Wonderful Story (1932)
 Murder at the Cabaret (1936)

Screenwriter
 Two Can Play (1926)
 The Guns of Loos (1928)
 Glorious Youth (1929)
 Warned Off (1930)
 Such Is the Law (1930)
 Prince of Arcadia (1933)
 Two Hearts in Waltz Time (1934)

References

External links

1893 births
1977 deaths
English male screenwriters
English film directors
People from Dartmouth, Devon
20th-century English screenwriters
20th-century English male writers